Coopenae–Extralum is a Costa Rican road cycling team, founded in 2015 at domestic level. In 2016 the team acquired a UCI Continental licence.

References

UCI Continental Teams (America)
Cycling teams based in Costa Rica
Cycling teams established in 2015